"House Of Cards" is the first single from Australian rock musician James Reyne’s second studio album Hard Reyne released in (1989). It peaked at number 17 in Australia.

Background and Promotion
In 1988, Reyne toured Australia, promoting his debut self titled album with Tina Turner. He then returned to the studio to work on new music. "House of Cards" was released as the first single from his second solo album.

Track listings
 CD Single/ 7”
 "House Of Cards" - 3:37
 "Walking In The Dreamtime” - 5:05

Weekly charts

External links

References

1989 songs
1989 singles
Capitol Records singles
James Reyne songs
Songs written by James Reyne
Songs written by Simon Hussey